The 1986 NBA playoffs was the postseason tournament of the National Basketball Association's 1985–86 season. The tournament concluded with the Eastern Conference champion Boston Celtics defeating the Western Conference champion Houston Rockets 4 games to 2 in the NBA Finals. Larry Bird was named NBA Finals MVP for the second time.

This was the second NBA Finals meeting between the Celtics and Rockets; they met in the 1981 NBA Finals with the same result. It was the third of four straight Eastern Conference championships for Boston, who won 67 games that year, and went 40–1 at home. The Rockets, meanwhile had won just their second conference title in franchise history.

Second-year player Michael Jordan put on a record-setting performance in Game 2 of the Bulls' first-round series against the Celtics, scoring 63 points in a 2-OT loss, which surpassed Elgin Baylor's 61-point performance from the 1962 NBA Finals and still stands as the NBA Playoff scoring record. Jordan averaged 44.7 points per game in the series, but was unable to prevent the Bulls from being swept by a more experienced, more talented Celtics team. The Bulls set a dubious mark by posting the second worst record for a playoff-qualifying team in history, going just 30–52 during the season. Game 2, where the record was set, was ranked by TV Guide as the 26th Most Memorable Moment in Television History, and is credited with boosting the NBA's popularity surge and eventual rise to near the top of the United States television sports market, trailing only football by the mid-90s.

The 1986 playoffs marked the third time in four years that the Milwaukee Bucks advanced to the Eastern Conference Finals, but it would be their last appearance in the series until 2001. The Celtics avenged their 1983 sweep by sweeping the Bucks in four games.

As for the Philadelphia 76ers, this was the last time they would play in a Game 7 until 2001. After their first round loss to the Atlanta Hawks, the Detroit Pistons would advance past the first round in each of the next five seasons (1987, 1988, 1989, 1990, 1991), which include all appearances in the conference finals, three NBA Finals, and two championships.

After moving from Kansas City, where the franchise played its previous thirteen seasons, the Sacramento Kings made their first postseason appearance in their first season in its new city.

Bracket

First round

Eastern Conference first round

(1) Boston Celtics vs. (8) Chicago Bulls

 Michael Jordan hits the game-tying free throws with no time left in regulation to force the first OT; Danny Ainge hits the game-tying lay-up with 12 seconds left in the first OT to force the second OT.
 Michael Jordan's 63 points scored is an NBA playoff record, this was George Gervin's final NBA game.

This was the second playoff meeting between these two teams, with the Celtics winning the first meeting.

(2) Milwaukee Bucks vs. (7) New Jersey Nets

This was the second playoff meeting between these two teams, with the Bucks winning the first meeting.

(3) Philadelphia 76ers vs. (6) Washington Bullets

 Dudley Bradley hits the game-winning 3 capping off a rally from 17 points down.

This was the fifth playoff meeting between these two teams, with each team winning two of the first four meetings.

(4) Atlanta Hawks vs. (5) Detroit Pistons

This was the fourth playoff meeting between these two teams, with the Hawks winning two of the first three meetings while in St. Louis.

Western Conference first round

(1) Los Angeles Lakers vs. (8) San Antonio Spurs

This was the third playoff meeting between these two teams, with the Lakers winning the first two meetings.

(2) Houston Rockets vs. (7) Sacramento Kings

This was the second playoff meeting between these two teams, with the Rockets winning the first meeting.

(3) Denver Nuggets vs. (6) Portland Trail Blazers

This was the second playoff meeting between these two teams, with the Trail Blazers winning the first meeting.

(4) Dallas Mavericks vs. (5) Utah Jazz

This was the first playoff meeting between the Mavericks and the Jazz.

Conference semifinals

Eastern Conference semifinals

(1) Boston Celtics vs. (4) Atlanta Hawks

 Hawks only scored 1 field goal in the third quarter.

This was the eighth playoff meeting between these two teams, with the Celtics winning six of the first seven meetings.

(2) Milwaukee Bucks vs. (3) Philadelphia 76ers

 Charles Barkley's goaltending on Craig Hodges with 29 seconds left; Bob McAdoo's and Bobby Jones' final NBA game.

This was the sixth playoff meeting between these two teams, with the 76ers winning four of the first five meetings.

Western Conference semifinals

(1) Los Angeles Lakers vs. (4) Dallas Mavericks

 Derek Harper redeemed himself from his 1984 mistake by hitting the game-winning 3 with 3 seconds left.

This was the second playoff meeting between these two teams, with the Lakers winning the first meeting.

(2) Houston Rockets vs. (3) Denver Nuggets

This was the first playoff meeting between the Nuggets and the Rockets.

Conference finals

Eastern Conference finals

(1) Boston Celtics vs. (2) Milwaukee Bucks

This was the fourth playoff meeting between these two teams, with the Celtics winning two of the first three meetings.

Western Conference finals

(1) Los Angeles Lakers vs. (2) Houston Rockets

 Ralph Sampson hits the famous off-balanced series winner at the buzzer; Hakeem Olajuwon was ejected in the fourth quarter for fighting Lakers forward Mitch Kupchak.

This was the second playoff meeting between these two teams, with the Rockets winning the first meeting.

NBA Finals: (E1) Boston Celtics vs. (W2) Houston Rockets

This was the fourth playoff meeting between these two teams, with the Celtics winning the first three meetings.

References

External links
 Basketball-Reference.com's 1986 NBA Playoffs page
 

National Basketball Association playoffs
Playoffs
Sports in Portland, Oregon

fi:NBA-kausi 1985–1986#Pudotuspelit